Xavier Worthy (born April 27, 2003) is an American football wide receiver for the Texas Longhorns.

High school career
Worthy attended Central East High School in Fresno, California. He was selected to play in the 2021 All-American Bowl, but the game was not played due to the COVID-19 pandemic. He originally committed to the University of Michigan to play college football but changed to the University of Texas at Austin.

College career
Worthy earned immediate playing time his freshman season at Texas in 2021. Worthy had a breakout freshman year at Texas breaking several freshman school records. These records include, receiving yards in a season with 981 yards and receiving touchdowns in a season with 12. These records were previously held by Roy Williams, who had 809 yards with 8 touchdowns in his 2000 freshman season. Worthy also broke the school freshman record of receiving yards in a game with 261 yards against rival Oklahoma. At the conclusion of Worthy’s freshman season, he was awarded true-freshman All-American by Pro Football Focus, 247 Sports, and FWAA.

Records
 University of Texas – Most receiving yards in a season by a freshman wide receiver (981, 2021)
 University of Texas – Most receiving yards in a game by a freshman wide receiver (261, 2021)
 University of Texas – Most receiving touchdowns in a full season by a freshman wide receiver (12, 2021)
 University of Texas – Most receiving touchdowns in a game by a freshman wide receiver (3, 2021)
 University of Texas – Most receptions in a game by a freshman wide receiver (14, 2021)
 University of Texas – Most receptions in a season by a freshman wide receiver (62, 2021)

Collegiate statistics

References

External links
Texas Longhorns bio

Living people
Sportspeople from Fresno, California
Players of American football from California
American football wide receivers
Texas Longhorns football players
2003 births